Yasmine Kimiko Yamada (born 30 August 1997) is a Swiss figure skater. She is the 2019 Open Ice Mall Cup champion, the 2016 Sportland Trophy bronze medalist, the 2019 Open d'Andorra bronze medalist, and the 2017 Swiss national champion. She competed in the final segment at the 2019 European Championships.

Career 
Yamada began learning to skate in 2002. Making her junior international debut, she took the bronze medal at the NRW Trophy in December 2011. Coached by Bettina Ariza-Hügin in Zürich, she competed at her first ISU Junior Grand Prix assignment in September 2012, placing 15th in Istanbul, Turkey.

Yamada's senior international debut came in November 2014 at the NRW Trophy. She trained in Switzerland under Ariza-Hügin until 2015. Igor Samohin began coaching her in California in the 2015–2016 season. Yamada won the bronze medal at the Sportland Trophy in early March 2016. Later in the same month, she appeared at her first ISU Championship, placing 34th at the World Championships in Boston.

In the 2016–2017 season, Yamada became the Swiss national champion. She placed 27th at the 2017 European Championships in Ostrava, Czech Republic, and 33rd at the 2017 World Championships in Helsinki, Finland.

Programs

Competitive highlights 
CS: Challenger Series; JGP: Junior Grand Prix

References

External links 
 

1997 births
Swiss female single skaters
Living people
Figure skaters from Zürich
Swiss people of Japanese descent
21st-century Swiss women